The Lutze Housebarn is a housebarn located in Newton, Manitowoc County, Wisconsin, United States. It was added to the National Register of Historic Places in 1984.

History
The building was constructed by Gottlieb and Fredericka Lutze. It is one of three buildings of its kind in the United States.

References

Barns on the National Register of Historic Places in Wisconsin
Houses in Manitowoc County, Wisconsin
Houses completed in 1849
Houses on the National Register of Historic Places in Wisconsin
1849 establishments in Wisconsin
National Register of Historic Places in Manitowoc County, Wisconsin